John Kierse (11 January 1918 – 31 August 2006) was an Australian cricketer. He played in one first-class match for South Australia in 1939/40.

See also
 List of South Australian representative cricketers

References

External links
 

1918 births
2006 deaths
Australian cricketers
South Australia cricketers